This is a list of years in Argentina. See also the timeline of Argentine history.  For only articles about years in Argentina that have been written, see :Category:Years in Argentina.

Twenty-first century

Twentieth century

Nineteenth century

See also 
 Timeline of Buenos Aires
 List of years by country

 
Argentina history-related lists
Argentina